Paronella Park is a heritage-listed tourist attraction located at Mena Creek, Queensland, Australia,  south of Cairns. It was designed and built between 1929 and 1935.

History

Paronella Park was built in the 1930s by José Paronella (ca.1888 – 23 August 1948), a Spanish immigrant. Paronella arrived in nearby Innisfail, Queensland, Australia in 1913, having sailed from his homeland, Catalonia, in northern Spain to plan a life for himself and his fiancée Matilda. He applied for Commonwealth naturalization in 1921, identifying his place of origin as La Vall in the province of Girona. In fact his full name was José Pedro Enrique Paronella, and he was born on 26 February 1887, in La Vall de Santa Creu, a hamlet in the province of Gerona, north-eastern Catalonia. Paronella worked hard for 11 years, creating his wealth by buying, improving, and selling cane farms. While travelling through the beautiful countryside he discovered a virgin forest alongside spectacular Mena Creek Falls - the perfect location for his dream.

Upon returning to Spain, Paronella discovered that Matilda had married another man. Determined to sail back with a bride, José proposed to Margarita, Matilda's younger sister. One year later, the newlyweds were ship-bound for Australia and by 1929 had purchased the land of José's dreams. He first built the grand 47-step staircase to shift building materials between the lower and upper level. Here, the couple had their cottage hand built of stone, and moved in on Christmas Eve.

Inspired by childhood memories of Catalan castles, Paronella and his workers set to work designing an entertainment area. Their fingerprints in the cement foundations remain as testament to their extraordinary effort. A movie theatre transformed on weekends into a huge ballroom with live bands who entertained while a massive ball of mirrors spun from the ceiling to reflect a dazzle of pink and blue lights. More than 7000 trees were planted around the Paronellas' home and castle, including an avenue of Kauris that tower now like cathedral spires in a sacred forest.

North Queensland's first hydro electric plant was built in 1933 to power the  park, and the castle grounds were ready to welcome the public in 1935. The Paronellas invited everyone to movies on Saturday nights, built tennis courts from crushed termite mounds, and a pavilion with turret-topped balconies, refreshment rooms and changing cubicles for swimmers. Eventually a museum featured a collection of coins, pistols, dolls, timbers and interesting keepsakes.

Unexpectedly, the tale of Paronella Park took swift and dangerous turns starting in 1946 when a mass of logs from a clearing upstream swept away a railway bridge and descended on the park, destroying the refreshment rooms. Undaunted, the Paronellas replanted gardens, repaired what they could, and re-opened for business 6 months later.

Paronella died in 1948, leaving Margarita, daughter Teresa, and son Joe. Teresa married Pino Zerlotti and Joe married Val Ribes. In 1967 Margarita died leaving Joe and Val as custodians of José's dream. After Joe's death in 1972, Val and their two sons Joe and Kerry, continued until the park was sold in 1977. In 1979 a fire swept through the castle, leaving only the walls and the turret as a reminder of what had been. In 1986, Cyclone Winifred tested the park's endurance once again.

The park changed owners several times until, in 1993, it was bought by the present owners. Mark and Judy Evans, the park's current owners rediscovered the almost lost park and envisaged reviving Paronella's dream with his appreciation for beauty and warm hospitality.

With the help of the Paronella family, Paronella's story was written ["The Spanish Dreamer" by Dena Leighton, available in the Paronella Park Gift Shop]. Paths were uncovered, buildings repaired, trees identified, and a museum created in the original home built by Paronella for his family. Cyclone Larry in 2006 added another chapter of endurance to the story, and the dream continued once again.

Paronella Park is eco-certified and heritage listed. Efforts today focus on maintaining the property while staying true to its historic and ecological values. A number of ongoing restoration and preservation projects will see the Paronella Park story live on for many years to come.

The Impossible Dream 

On 24 July 2010, a theater production, The Impossible Dream was launched at Shangri-La Hotel, The Marina, Cairns. The Impossible Dream is based on the true story of José and his bride Margarita.

Hydroelectric plant 

In 1933, Paronella installed a hydro-electric plant, the first (privately owned) in Queensland, on the waterfall in the park. He used it to supply power for the park's lighting, pumps, refrigeration and cinema. The town of Mena Creek also used some of the electricity. The plant was eventually decommissioned.

In 2009 the park completed a restoration of the plant, and now runs entirely off hydro-electric power. Some of the excess electricity is fed back into the local grid.

Activities 
Today, visitors are taken on a range of guided tours. Paronella's story is told and the highlights of the park shown through the day and into the night.

The Dream Continues tour - a 45-minute guided walk, departing every half-hour from 9:30 a.m. until 4:30 p.m., highlighting features of the park and telling the story of José Paronella’s ideas for the site.

The Darkness Falls tour - a one-hour night tour of the site at 6:20 p.m., with an additional tour at 8:30 p.m. during peak season.

Self-guided Botanical Walk - a self-guided tour, with the aid of a 16-page booklet containing details of the park's flora, with various tree species identified throughout the park.

Awards and recognitions
In 2004, Paronella Park was named Queensland's premier significant attraction by the Queensland Tourism. It was also a joint winner in the "Emerging Business" category of the Reconciliation Awards for Business (2004), awarded by the Queensland Government.

Paronella Park, in the middle of the Canecutter Way, was voted the Number One "Must Do" in the RACQ 150 Must Do competition in 2009. In 2009 as part of the Q150 celebrations, Paronella Park was announced as one of the Q150 Icons of Queensland for its role as a "location".

References

External links

 
 The Impossible Dream Official website
 Sounds recorded at Paronella Park

Amusement parks in Queensland
Buildings and structures in Far North Queensland
Parks in Queensland
Queensland Heritage Register
1930 establishments in Australia
Tourist attractions in Far North Queensland